Aliou Dieng (born 16 October 1997) is a Malian professional footballer who plays as a defensive midfielder for Egyptian Premier League club Al Ahly and the Mali national team.

Club career
In July 2019, Dieng joined Egyptian club Al Ahly on a five-year contract for an undisclosed fee.

International career
Dieng represented a local team of Mali at the 2016 African Nations Championship, and scored a penalty in their 2–1 quarter-final win over Tunisia.
In 2020, Dieng played for the Malian national team for the first time at non-local level, in 2-1 victory against Namibia. With his home country, he also participated at the 2021 Africa Cup of Nations.

Career statistics

Club
.

International

Scores and results list Mali's goal tally first, score column indicates score after each Dieng goal.

Honours
Al Ahly
Egyptian Premier League: 2019-20
 Egypt Cup: 2019–20
Egyptian Super Cup: 2018-19
 CAF Champions League: 2019–20, 2020-21
 FIFA Club World Cup Third place: 2020, Third-Place 2021
 CAF Super Cup: 2021 (May), 2021 (December)

References

External links
 

1997 births
Living people
Mali international footballers
Malian footballers
Algerian Ligue Professionnelle 1 players
Malian expatriate footballers
Malian expatriate sportspeople in Algeria
Djoliba AC players
MC Alger players
2016 African Nations Championship players
2021 Africa Cup of Nations players
Association football defenders
21st-century Malian people
Mali A' international footballers